Patrick Ward (4 January 1950 – 14 October 2019) was an Australian actor noted for several performances on Australian television.  He died from cancer on October 14, 2019.

Early career

Ward began his career as a dancer in choreographer Ross Coleman's production of Gotta Move at Sydney's Union Theatre (now Footbridge Theatre) around the same time as being signed by Pat Woodley's modelling agency. He trained at Sydney's Independent Theatre and signed with International Casting Services run by Gloria Payten who initially secured work for him as an extra in films such as That Lady from Peking and Color Me Dead.

TV
At the beginning of the 1970s he was scoring acting work in various television shows. He played Gilbert Bunthorp in ABC TV's adaptation of The Cousin from Fiji, a soldier in Spyforce and a Vietnam veteran in The Godfathers (TV series). Further television roles came in police drama Matlock Police in 1973 and as Sam Wandsworth in the teen soap opera Class of '74. He played Nicholas Brent in the 1974 film version of Number 96, and was a regular, Cornelius (aka Corny), in the serial The Unisexers (1975) produced by Cash Harmon Television, the makers of Number 96. The Unisexers was cancelled after just three weeks and 16 episodes due to poor ratings. Ward had previously played Mike Parsons in the television version of Number 96 in 1972.

Ward had a regular support role as Constable Peter Fleming in the police serial Cop Shop starting late 1977 but left the series within three months of its launch. In 1980 he was a regular cast member of a new soap opera, Arcade, created by several members of the creative team from Number 96. Arcade was a critical and ratings failure and was cancelled after six weeks on air.  and played a guest role in the US series The Love Boat in 1981.

Ward subsequently played a regular role in the situation comedy My Two Wives (1992). Other TV roles included appearances in A Country Practice (1983), Chances (1991), Phoenix (TV series) (1992), Mission: Impossible (1988), All Saints (2001), Farscape (2001 and 2003) and Bad Cop, Bad Cop (2003). Miniseries appearances include ANZACS and Fields of Fire. Film roles included the cult film Stone in 1974 and the feature film Restraint (2008).

Film
Ward appeared in the opening sequence of Peter Weir's The Cars That Ate Paris, played tough guy Tex in Sidecar Racers and worked opposite Helen Morse in Stone. He acted in the film The Chain Reaction (1980). Other films include Jindalee Lady
and The Crossing (1990 film).

References

External links
 

1950 births
2019 deaths
Australian male television actors
Male actors from Sydney